Romario Sharma (born 19 December 1994) is an Indian cricketer. He made his List A debut for Assam in the 2017–18 Vijay Hazare Trophy on 11 February 2018. He made his first-class debut for Assam in the 2018–19 Ranji Trophy on 20 November 2018.

References

External links
 

1994 births
Living people
Indian cricketers
Assam cricketers